Jimmy Madison may refer to:

Jimmy Madison (musician), American jazz musician
James Madison (1751–1836), 4th US president